John Llewellyn "Tim" Heaney (14 August 1914 – 14 July 1996) was a South African cricketer who played first-class cricket for Transvaal from 1935 to 1952.

Tim Heaney was an accurate slow-left-arm spin bowler. In his first Currie Cup match after World War II he took 6 for 45 off 28 eight-ball overs in the first innings against Rhodesia. A week earlier, in a friendly match against Natal, he had taken 6 for 73 off 33 overs in a match Transvaal lost by an innings.

References

External links

1914 births
1996 deaths
People from Mossel Bay
South African cricketers
Gauteng cricketers
Cricketers from the Western Cape